The Battle of Malemort occurred on 21 April 1177 between the mercenary forces of Richard the Lionheart and the citizens of Malemort-sur-Corrèze in the Limousin. The Brabançon mercenaries under William of Cambrai were defeated and William killed, while the forces under Lobar the Wolf and the Viscount of Turenne led an assault on the town of Segur and sacked it.

References

Cheyette, Fredric L. Ermengard of Narbonne and the World of the Troubadours. Ithaca: Cornell University Press, 2001.

Mercenaries
1177 in Europe
Malemort
Malemort
Malemort
History of Corrèze
History of Limousin
1170s in France